Patricia ‘Pat’ Lenihan is a former camogie player, captain of the All Ireland Camogie Championship winning team in 1982.

Career
She scored two goals in Cork's 1982 All Ireland 7-8 to 3-10 semi-final victory over Kilkenny and an early goal in the final – the match had started with a Dublin goal and Lenihan replied immediately with another. In 1983 she was the winner of the Jury's Sports Camogie Player of the Year award.

References

External links
 Camogie.ie Official Camogie Association Website
 Wikipedia List of Camogie players

Cork camogie players
Living people
Year of birth missing (living people)